Amenah "Mina" Flaminiano Pangandaman is a Filipina economist who is the Secretary of the Department of Budget and Management (DBM) of the Philippines since June 30, 2022. She is the first Muslim budget secretary and the only Muslim in the cabinet of President Bongbong Marcos. Her appointment was approved by the Commission on Appointments on September 28, 2022.

Education
She earned her bachelor's degree in economics from Far Eastern University. She also has a master's degree and a certification in development economics from the University of the Philippines.

Career
Pangandaman started her career as a researcher at the Senate of the Philippines. She climbed up the ranks until eventually becoming chief of staff to former Senate president Edgardo Angara in 2007. She also worked with former Senate finance committee chairperson and now returning senator Loren Legarda.

Pangadaman had served as a budget official during Benjamin Diokno's time as DBM chief becoming assistant secretary from 2016 to 2018 and undersecretary from 2018 to 2019. During that stint, she was the group head of the Office of the Secretary and was a “key mover” in the preparation, implementation, and monitoring of the General Appropriations Act or national budget. She joined the Bangko Sentral ng Pilipinas (BSP) in 2019 as a technical adviser and later became managing director of the Office of the Governor and Executive Offices. In 2021, she became an assistant governor.

References

|-

Living people
21st-century Filipino economists
Far Eastern University alumni
University of the Philippines alumni
Year of birth missing (living people)
Secretaries of Budget and Management of the Philippines
Bongbong Marcos administration cabinet members
Filipino Muslims
Women members of the Cabinet of the Philippines